Cecilio Acosta (1 February 1818 – 8 July 1881), was a Venezuelan writer, journalist, lawyer, philosopher and humanist.

Career 
Acosta was born in 1818 in a small village known as San Diego de los Altos. Acosta is the son of Ignacio Acosta and Juana Margarita Revete Martínez. His early education was from the priest Mariano Fernández Fortique. In 1831 he entered the seminary Tridentino of Santa Rosa in Caracas and began his training to become a priest. In 1840, he leaves the seminary and enters the Academy of Mathematics, where he became a surveyor. Later on, Acosta studied philosophy and law at the Central University of Venezuela, receiving his law degree.
Around 1846 and 1847, he began publishing essays in newspapers, such as, La Epoca and El Centinela de la Patria.

Between 1908 and 1909, Acosta published five volumes of complete works, that showed his political, economic, social and educational ideas. He also wrote poetry.

He died on 8 July 1881.
Since 1937 his remains are at the National Pantheon of Venezuela.

Catholic University Cecilio Acosta, a private university, was named after him. It was founded in 1983 in the city of Maracaibo.

Work 
 Known things and knowing (1856). Original title, Cosas sabidas y cosas por saberse.
 Charity or fruits of the cooperation of all to the well of all (1855). Original title, Caridad o frutos de la cooperación de todos al bien de todos.
 Studies of International Law (1917)
 Influence of the historical-political elements in the dramatic literature and in the novel (posthumous, 1887)
 Complete works (1908 - 1909)
 Complete works (Fundación La Casa de Bello, Definite, 1981)

References 

19th-century Venezuelan lawyers
19th-century male writers
1881 deaths
Venezuelan philosophers
1818 births
Venezuelan journalists
Venezuelan male poets
19th-century Venezuelan poets
Burials at the National Pantheon of Venezuela